Drouetius is a genus of true weevils (family Curculionidae). It has three described species, all of them from the Azores archipelago.

Species
Drouetius azoricus (Drouet, 1859)
Drouetius borgesi Machado, 2009
Drouetius oceanicus  Machado, 2009

References

Endemic arthropods of the Azores
Cerambycidae genera
Beetles described in 1942